The Daimler-Benz DB 605 is a German aircraft engine built during World War II. Developed from the DB 601, the DB 605 was used from 1942 to 1945 in the Messerschmitt Bf 109 fighter, and the Bf 110 and Me 210C heavy fighters.

The DB 610, a pair of DB 605s geared to turn a single output shaft that replaced the similar DB 606, was used in the A-3 and all A-5 variants of Germany's only operational heavy bomber, the Heinkel He 177A.

License-built versions of the DB 605 were used in the Macchi C.205, Fiat G.55, Reggiane 2005 and some other Italian aircraft. It was also used in the Swedish SAAB B 18B and initially in the pusher-design SAAB J 21. Approximately 42,400 DB 605s of all kinds were built.

Design and development
The primary differences between the 605 and 601 were greater displacement, higher revolutions, higher compression ratio and a more powerful supercharger. Engineers determined that the cylinders could be bored out to a larger diameter without seriously affecting the strength of the existing block. The change was small, increasing the cylinder bore from the 601's 150 mm to the 605's 154 mm, but this increased the overall displacement from 33.9 litres to 35.7. Altered valve timing increased the inlet period and improved the scavenging to give greater volumetric efficiency at higher speeds, which improved the maximum allowable RPM from 2,600 in the 601 to 2,800 in the 605. The combination of these changes raised power output from 1,350 PS (1,332 hp) to 1,475 PS (1,455 hp). Engine weight increased from 700 to 756 kg.

In other ways the engine was essentially identical to the 601, being an inverted V-12 (with the crankshaft above the cylinders). Both used dual Bosch magnetos firing twin spark plugs for ignition. Bosch direct fuel injection was powered by a pump supplying up to 90 bar. The oil system used three pumps with a separate 35-litre oil tank. The supercharger was advanced for the era in that it used a barometrically controlled hydraulic clutch (fluid coupling) which allowed the system automatically to compensate for changes in altitude.

One major design difference was the switch from ball bearings to plain bearings which, when combined with increasingly poor grades of lubricants, led to serious problems in service, including engine fires; initially, for example, the use of emergency power was forbidden. Although Daimler-Benz redesigned the bearings and added oil slingers and their associated coolers, the RLM considered the DB 605 to be a "sick engine" and the problems had not been fully resolved by the end of the war.

Along with bearing difficulties, the DB 605 suffered particularly badly from the materials shortages in wartime Germany. From the outbreak of war onwards critical shortages of elements such as nickel and cobalt meant that the DB 605 had its exhaust valves reduced in nickel content from about 13.5% to 8%. This resulted in them becoming insufficiently corrosion resistant, and they began to scale in use. This scale then caused pre-ignition, which led to catastrophic detonation and eventually engine failure. This was the primary reason that the full 1.42 ata manifold pressure was not permitted, although the problems occurred for a long time before the official order restricting the power level was given (Jumo and BMW suffered exactly the same problem for some time). This was eventually fixed by applying a very heavy chrome plating to the exhaust valves, which rendered them just sufficiently resistant to scaling while still using less of a critical element than the original nickel alloy. BMW had developed this plating technique first, as the BMW 801 in the Fw 190 had also been suffering from a spate of detonation induced engine failures.

Like the 601, the 605 was designed to run on "B4" fuel with an octane rating of 87. In 1944 a series of newer engines was introduced, allowing the engine to run on the 100 octane "C3" fuel and optionally including fittings for various optional power-boosting agent dispensing systems, such as the MW50 methanol-water injection system, and GM-1 nitrous oxide injection system. The DB 605AM, running initially on C3 and MW-50, saw power improved to 1,800 PS (1775 hp) for takeoff. In mid-1944, the requirement for C3 was dropped and standard B4 fuel with MW-50 was used. The DB 605AS(M) improved the maximum rated altitude by using a larger supercharger taken from the DB 603 but was otherwise similar to the A(M). The DB 605ASB's takeoff power was also rated at 1,800 PS (1,775 hp), while maintaining the high-altitude performance of the ASM. The final version of the A-series was the DB 605ASC of 1945, which improved takeoff power to 2,000 PS (1,973 hp).

As early as 1942 Daimler had also been working on an upgraded D-series engine that could run on either C2 or C3 fuel. The first of these, which appeared in late 1944, was a small series of DB 605DM, followed by the main production series, the DB 605DB/DC. These engines were fitted with an adjustable screw stop which allowed the use of either B4 fuel with MW-50, or C-3 fuel without MW-50, in which case the engine was designated DB 605DB, or the use of C-3 fuel with MW-50, in which case the engine was given the -DC suffix instead. In its DB-suffix form the engine generated 1,800 PS (1,775 hp) for take-off at 1.8 ata, while the DC was capable of 2,000 PS (1,973 hp) at 1.98 ata. If MW-50 was not available for use with the B4 fuel the throttle was limited to 1.45 ata for the entire flight. Thus, this series was ideally suited to catering for the chaotic fuel supply situation prevalent during the last months of the Third Reich. These engines were mainly used in the Bf 109G-10 and K-4 series.

An unusual application of the DB 605 was its installation in a captured Supermarine Spitfire.  In November 1942, Spitfire VB EN830 NX-X of 131 Squadron made a forced landing in a turnip field in German-occupied Jersey.  The plane was repaired by German forces and re-engined with a DB 605A, amongst other modifications. The aircraft was operated by the Luftwaffe until 14 August 1944, when it was destroyed during a USAAF bombing raid.

Variants
Production versions

DB 605AStandard fighter engine, up to 1475 PS, B4 fuel
DB 605AM605 A with MW-50 system, up to 1800 PS, C3 fuel
DB 605ASAltitude optimized version of 605A using the larger DB 603 supercharger, up to 1435 PS, B4 fuel  
DB 605ASM605 AS with MW-50 system, up to 1800 PS, C3 fuel
DB 605ASB/605ABlate-war version, first version up to 1850 PS, later reduced to 1800 PS, B4 fuel with MW-50 or C3 fuel without MW-50
DB 605ASClate-war version, up to 2000 PS with MW-50, C3 fuel
DB 605BSame as 605 A but for use in twin-engined aircraft like Messerschmitt Bf 110, Me 210 (different prop/gear ratio)
DB 605BSproposed version for twin-engined aircraft, derived from DB 605 AS
DB 605DBImproved 605 DM, standard MW-50 equipment, first version up to 1850 PS, later reduced to 1800 PS, B4 fuel with MW-50 or C3 fuel without MW-50
DB 605DCImproved 605 DM, standard MW-50 equipment, up to 2000 PS, C3 fuel
DB 605DMFirst DB 605 D version, standard MW-50 equipment, up to 1700 PS
DB 605Eproposed version for twin-engined aircraft, derived from DB 605 D
DB 605T Developed to drive the HZ Anlage supercharger for the Henschel Hs 130
DB 605 LSimilar to 605 D but with two-stage supercharger, 1700 PS, development stopped in December 1944 
Fiat RA.1050 R.C.58 TifoneLicence built / developed DB 605A-1 engines, built by Fiat in Italy.
DB 610Two DB 605s "coupled" (geared together) as a "power system" (71.53L / 4364.8in3), to turn a single propeller shaft, used in the Heinkel He 177A Mirror-imaged starboard component engine supercharger.
DB 610A - Propeller RH rotation - Reduction ratio 0.413: 1.
Climbing  at 2,600 rpm with 1.3 atmos. boost at sea level.
Maximum cruising  at 2,300 rpm with 1.15 atmos. boost  at sea level.
Fuel consumption  (max cruise at sea level).
Total length  ; width ; height  ; weight .
DB 610B - Propeller LH rotation - Weight 
DB 610C - Propeller RH rotation
Climbing  at 2,600 rpm at sea level.
Maximum cruising  at 2,300 rpm at sea level.
DB 610D - Propeller LH rotation
DB 616A development of the DB 605.
DB 620Coupled DB628 engines.
DB 621A projected two-stage supercharged DB605
DB 625A turbocharged DB605
DB 628The DB 605, fitted with a two-stage supercharger, abandoned in March 1944.
IAR DB605Licence production in Romania by Industria Aeronautică Română (IAR).

Note: All power ratings in PS (metric horsepower). Unless otherwise noted takeoff/emergency power at sea level.

Survivors
A Hispano Aviación HA-1112, a license-built Messerschmitt Bf 109 G-2, has been rebuilt by EADS/Messerschmitt Foundation in Germany with a Daimler-Benz DB 605 engine.

Applications
DB 605
Caproni Campini Ca.183bis(intended)
Fiat G.55
IAR 471
Macchi C.205
Messerschmitt Bf 109G/K
Messerschmitt Bf 110G
Messerschmitt Me 210
Reggiane Re.2005
 Saab 18B, T
Saab 21
Savoia-Marchetti SM.91
Savoia-Marchetti SM.92
Savoia-Marchetti SM.93
VL Pyörremyrsky
DB 610
Dornier Do 317B
Heinkel He 177A-3 and A-5
Messerschmitt Me 261V3
SNCAC NC.3021 Belphégor

Engines on display
Preserved DB 605 engines are on display at the Royal Air Force Museum, London and the National Air and Space Museum, Washington D.C.

Specifications (DB 605AM)

See also

References

Notes

Bibliography

 Gregor, Neil Daimler-Benz in the Third Reich. Yale University Press, 1998

 Jane's Fighting Aircraft of World War II. London. Studio Editions Ltd, 1989. 
 Hermann, Dietmar and Ringlstetter, Herbert. Messerschmitt Bf 109 : Vom Prototyp bis zur Bf 109 K. München, GER: GeraMond Verlag, 2017. 
 Hitchcock, Thomas. Bf 109K: Monogram Close-Up 16.Boylston MA: Monogram Aviation Publications, 1979. 
 Mankau, Heinz and Peter Petrick. Messerschmitt Bf 110/Me 210/Me 410: An Illustrated History. Atglen PA: Schiffer Publishing Ltd., 2003. 
 Mermet, Jean-Claude. Messerschmitt Bf 109G-1 through K-4: Engines and Fittings. Marnaz, France: Jean-Claude Mermet SA, 1999.
 Smith, J Richard and Eddie J. Creek. Heinkel He 177 Greif: Heinkel's Strategic Bomber. Hersham, Surrey, UK: Ian Allan Publishing, 2012.

External links

 Aviation History.com, DB 600 series page
 The Daimler-Benz DB 605
 Website on Messerschmitt Bf 109 performance.

Daimler-Benz aircraft engines
1940s aircraft piston engines
Inverted V12 aircraft engines